Lago delle Piane is a lake in the Province of Biella, Piedmont, Italy. At an elevation of 325 m, its surface area is 0.427 km2.

Bibliography 
  Atlante dei laghi Piemontesi, Regione Piemonte – Direzione Pianificazione delle Risorse Idriche –  2003

Lakes of Piedmont
Province of Biella
Biellese Alps